The 1993–94 season was the 70th season in the existence of AEK Athens F.C. and the 35th consecutive season in the top flight of Greek football. They competed in the Alpha Ethniki, the Greek Cup, the Greek Super Cup and the UEFA Champions League. The season began on 18 August 1993 and finished on 24 April 1994.

Overview
The people of AEK Athens were living very historic moments, since the club won the Greek championship for the third consecutive season! In the summer of 1993, the administration of Karras-Melissanidis, in collaboration with Dušan Bajević, decided to make a small renewal in the roster, even though the team won the championship of the previous season. So the older "veterans" Minou, Vasilopoulos, Karagiozopoulos, Papaioannou, Georgiadis left the club and the younger and talanted Kasapis, Borbokis, Vlachos and Vasilis Karagiannis came in, while it was also decided that the "young" Atmatsidis, Tsiartas, Kopitsis that were acquired in the previous season.

Bajević showed for another year a very strong team and AEK conquered the championship easilier than the previous season, while the team of the era was establishing itself as one of the most important teams in Greek football. The important victories were against Panathinaikos with 1–2 away and 2–0 at home, while the biggest victory in terms of score was against Apollon Athens with 4–0. The title was mathematically sealed after the penultimate match against Apollon Kalamarias. After the game of last matchday against OFI, there was a beautiful title fiesta.

For the first round of the UEFA Champions League, AEK were drawn against the powerful Monaco of Arsene Wenger. In the first match at Stade Louis II, lined up without Manolas, AEK appeared frivolous, unprepared and disjointed, as they were vulnerable in their defensive line, problematic in the midfield and the offense was not particularly threatening. The French created a flurry of chances, but got the win thanks to an own goal by Vlachos. In the rematch of Nikos Goumas Stadium, AEK were not bold and quickly found themselves back in the score with a goal by Djorkaeff, but managed to equalize early enough with Slišković, but without becoming particularly threatening. Afterwards, the fatigue and in general the bad condition of some of her players, as well as the superiority of their opponent, did not allow her to achieve anything special and they were inevitably eliminated. Arsene Wenger, who in the previous season had been eliminated by Olympiacos with two draws, admitted that AEK was a more technical team than the red and whites, but with the difference that the latter had played stronger in the match between them.

In the institution of the cup, AEK initially easily overcame the obstacles of Paniliakos and Asteras Ambelokipoi and reached the quarter-finals of the competition where they faced AEL. They won 0–1 away from home and drew 1–1 at Nea Filadelfeia. In the semi-finals they played against Aris, where they kept the goalless draw in Thessaloniki and beat them in Athens with 2–1. In the final of the against Panathinaikos in the packed Olympic Stadium, one of the best Cup finals of all time took place. Panathinaikos took the lead with a goal by Warzycha in the 31st minute, while in the 54th minute they double their goals with an own goal by Manolas, but AEK found the focus to equalize with goals by Alexandris at the 71st minute and Dimitriadis at the 77th minute, sending the match to extra time. There, Alexandris made it 2–3 in the 95th minute, but three minutes before the end, Panathinaikos equalized with Markos. The match went to penalty shooy-out where Panathinaikos won with 4–2 and took the trophy.

The best players of the team for this period were Alexis Alexandris, Toni Savevski, Refik Šabanadžović, Stelios Manolas, Michalis Kasapis and Vasilis Dimitriadis. The top scorer of both the team and the league was Alexandris, who together with Warzycha scored 24 goals.

Players

Squad information

NOTE: The players are the ones that have been announced by the AEK Athens' press release. No edits should be made unless a player arrival or exit is announced. Updated 30 June 1994, 23:59 UTC+3.

Transfers

In

Summer

Out

Summer

Loan out

Summer

Renewals

Overall transfer activity

Expenditure
Summer:  ₯50,000,000

Winter:  ₯0

Total:  ₯50,000,000

Income
Summer:  ₯0

Winter:  ₯0

Total:  ₯0

Net Totals
Summer:  ₯50,000,000

Winter:  ₯0

Total:  ₯50,000,000

Pre-season and friendlies

Greek Super Cup

Alpha Ethniki

League table

Results summary

Results by Matchday

Fixtures

Greek Cup

Group 14

Matches

Round of 32

Round of 16

Quarter-finals

Semi-finals

Final

UEFA Champions League

First round

Statistics

Squad statistics

! colspan="13" style="background:#FFDE00; text-align:center" | Goalkeepers
|-

! colspan="13" style="background:#FFDE00; color:black; text-align:center;"| Defenders
|-

! colspan="13" style="background:#FFDE00; color:black; text-align:center;"| Midfielders
|-

! colspan="13" style="background:#FFDE00; color:black; text-align:center;"| Forwards
|-

|}

Disciplinary record

|-
! colspan="20" style="background:#FFDE00; text-align:center" | Goalkeepers

|-
! colspan="20" style="background:#FFDE00; color:black; text-align:center;"| Defenders

|-
! colspan="20" style="background:#FFDE00; color:black; text-align:center;"| Midfielders

|-
! colspan="20" style="background:#FFDE00; color:black; text-align:center;"| Forwards

|}

References

External links
AEK Athens F.C. Official Website

AEK Athens F.C. seasons
AEK Athens
Greek football championship-winning seasons